Baltimore Pike station, also known as Baltimore Avenue station is a SEPTA Route 102 trolley stop in Clifton Heights, Pennsylvania. It is officially located near Baltimore Pike & Odgen Street, however the shed is located on the opposite side of this intersection between Glenwood and Bridge Avenues.

Trolleys arriving at this station travel between 69th Street Terminal in Upper Darby, Pennsylvania and Sharon Hill, Pennsylvania. The station has a shed with a roof where people can go inside when it is raining. Baltimore Pike is a major stop, not only because it's a commercial strip with a SEPTA bus connection, but because the street itself is also a state highway (State Route 2016) that connects U.S. 1 and U.S. 13.

Station layout

References

External links

Baltimore Pike; Media/Sharon Hill (Kavanaugh Transit Systems)
 Station from Baltimore Pike from Google Maps Street View

SEPTA Media–Sharon Hill Line stations